Bornealcis is a genus of moths in the family Geometridae.

Species
 Bornealcis derivata (Prout, 1926)
 Bornealcis expleta (Prout, 1932)
 Bornealcis versicolor (Prout, 1915)

References
 Bornealcis at Markku Savela's Lepidoptera and Some Other Life Forms
Natural History Museum Lepidoptera genus database

Boarmiini